William Todd Gabbett (September 13, 1942 – January 14, 2021) was an American football player and coach. He served as the head football coach at Catholic University in Washington, D.C., from 1969 to 1970, compiling a record of 5–7–1. Gabbett played college football at the University of Illinois.

References

External links 
Obituary

1942 births
2021 deaths
American football offensive guards
American football offensive tackles
Catholic University Cardinals football coaches
Illinois Fighting Illini football players
People from Peoria, Illinois